Wilson Yip Wai-Shun (born 1964) is a Hong Kong actor, filmmaker and screenwriter. His films include Bio Zombie, The White Dragon, SPL: Sha Po Lang, Dragon Tiger Gate, Flash Point and the Ip Man series.

Early career
A film buff at an early age, Yip went to the cinema whenever he could and often wrote reviews on the backs of ticket stubs. He entered the movie business in the 1980s, starting out as a "gofer" and working his way up to assistant director.

His directorial debut was 01.00 AM, a three-segment horror compendium. He directed two of three parts, one with Veronica Yip as a nurse who sees dead pop stars, and Anita Yuen interviewing a demon.

His next effort, Daze Reaper, was a Category III exploitation film, based on a true-crime story about a prison guard who turns to crime.  Next was Mongkok Story, an exploitive story in the vein of Young and Dangerous, and another horror trilogy, Midnight Zone, about urban myths. He also turned to comedy with Teaching Sucks, about two Hong Kong teachers played by Anthony Wong and Jan Lam.

In 1998 Wilson co-wrote and directed his biggest cult hit at the time, Bio Zombie, which was influenced by Dawn of the Dead and takes place in a shopping mall, where a small group of misfits bands together in order to survive.

Turning point
Yip next directed the 1999 crime-drama Bullets Over Summer, starring Francis Ng and Louis Koo as two detectives hunting a gang of deadly criminals who have to use a demented elderly woman's (Helena Law Lan) apartment for surveillance. The biggest-budget film of his career up to then, he considers Bullets Over Summer his "turning point". He shared a best-screenplay award at the 2000 Hong Kong Film Critics Society Awards for the film.

In 2000 he was picked by Golden Harvest to direct Skyline Cruisers, a big-budget action film. Yip did not get along with the cast and clashed with the studio's management over creative differences.

Other films include the science-fiction-action story 2002, and the romantic comedies, Dry Wood Fierce Fire (with Miriam Yeung and Louis Koo) and Leaving Me, Loving You (with Leon Lai and Faye Wong). In 2004, Yip also directed his first wuxia style film, The White Dragon, starring Cecilia Cheung and Francis Ng.

Yip also acts, mostly doing small roles. They include a pimp in The Runaway Pistol and a Taoist exorcist in the Pang Brothers' The Eye.

Films with Donnie Yen
In 2005, Yip directed his most critically acclaimed film, SPL: Sha Po Lang. A gritty return to the 1980s style of Hong Kong action cinema, SPL starred Simon Yam and Donnie Yen as Hong Kong police officers trying to pin a crime on an unstoppable gangster, portrayed by Sammo Hung.

In 2006, Yip re-teamed with Yen for an adaptation of a Hong Kong manga, Dragon Tiger Gate. In 2007 Yip released Flash Point, another martial-arts crime drama in the same vein as SPL. The film starred Donnie Yen, Louis Koo, and Collin Chou.

Yen and Yip's latest collaboration as actor and director, Ip Man, is a semi-biographical account of Ip Man, the first martial arts master (Chinese: Sifu) to teach the Chinese martial art of Wing Chun openly. It also featured fight choreography by Sammo Hung. The film was released in December 2008 and immediately shot to number one on its opening week in Hong Kong, earning over HK$2.8 million in three weeks.

Ip Man 2, which is produced by Raymond Wong, picks up on Ip Man's life after his migration to Hong Kong where he took on his most famous disciple, Bruce Lee. The film was released 29 April 2010.

In 2014, it was announced that Yip and Yen would reunite for a third Ip Man film, to start filming in early 2015 for release later in the year. The film will be presented in theatres in 3D format for the first time in the franchise.

In 2016, Donnie Yen announced that he and Yip would collaborate once again on a fourth Ip Man film.

Filmography
This is a list of films which was participated by Wilson Yip.

Director

Screenwriter
 Bio Zombie (1998)
 Baau lit ying ging (Bullets Over Summer) (1999)
 Jue lai yip yue leung saan ang (Juliet in Love) (2000)
 Gon chaai lit feng (Dry Wood Fierce Fire) (2001)
 Dai sing siu si (Leaving Me, Loving You) (2004)
 The White Dragon (2004)
 SPL: Sha Po Lang (2005)

Artistic director
 Ip Man (2013)

Actor
 Wong gok fung wan (Mongkok Story) (1996)
 Hui zhuan shou shi (Midnight Zone) (1997)
 Huo xing gui ji (Among the Stars) (2000)
 Sui jeuk fun ji (United We Stand and Swim) (2001)
 You Shoot, I Shoot (2001)
 Zouhou qiang (Runaway Pistol) (2002)
 Happy Family (2002)
 Love Undercover (2002)
 The Eye (2002)
 Chuet sai hiu B (Mighty Baby) (2002)
 Obake yashiki (2002)
 Tai yang wu zhi (2003)

Producer
 All's Well, Ends Well 2010 (2010)
 SPL 2 (2015)
 League of Gods (2016)
 Heartfall Arises (2016)
 Ip Man 4 (2019)
 Limbo (2021)

References

External links

Wilson Yip interview
 HK cinemagic entry

Living people
Hong Kong film directors
Hong Kong male film actors
1963 births